Chippy is a 2017  Malayalam language film produced by B S Babu under the banner of Film finity Productions.The film stars Srinda Arhaan, Joy Mathew and Sruthi Menon in the lead roles along with Surabhi Lakshmi, Salim Kumar, Indrans, Vijilesh and Manikandan R Achari. The film is directed by Pradeep Chokli, while the music is composed by Sachin Balu. The screenplay is based on a story written by Vineesh Palayadu. It was also nominated for Kerala State children film awards 2018.

Plot 
Chippy is the story of a group of schoolchildren from Thalassery, a coastal region in Kerala. They plan to make a short film portraying their lives. The story is about the life of Shobha, who is the mother of one of the children. She will lose her husband who was the only breadwinner for the family. Later she has to sell all her hens and her home for her living. The film also portrays their condition that the children even asks her whether she would sell them also. Later she and her children have to seek respite in a school building. There is a woman who sells "Kaya varuthathu" in the area who helps them regularly for each and everything. She is chosen to pay the role of Shobha when they plan to make a short film to portray Shobha's life and the difficulties faced by the children.

Cast 

Srinda Arhaan   
Surabhi Lakshmi
Shruthy Menon
Joy Mathew
Salim Kumar
 Vijilesh
 Manju Sunichen
 Amaldev
 Ajmal
 Adwaijith
 Adwaith
 Swathy
 Thanha
 Sivani
Indrans
 Manikandan R Achari
 Muthumani

Soundtrack 
The music is composed by Sachin Balu along with K S Chitra, P Jayachandran and Sreya Jayadeep.

 "Maarivillukale"- Sooryagayathri
 "Nilakkadalayum Korichirikkana"- Sreya Jayadeep
 "Munthirichaarum"- P Jayachandran        
 "Kadal Shankhinullil"- K S Chithra

See also
Joy Mathew

References 

2017 films
2010s Malayalam-language films
Indian drama films
2017 drama films